Port Botany Bus Depot is a bus depot in the Sydney suburb of Port Botany operated by Transdev John Holland.

History
On 8 May 1951 a new depot opened on the corner of Bunnerong Road and Wentworth Avenue, Pagewood. In the mid-1980s, the depot was relocated to a new site on Bumborah Point Road, Port Botany with the Pagewood site redeveloped as Westfield Eastgardens.

As part of the contracting out of Sydney Bus Region 9, operation of Port Botany depot passed from State Transit to Transdev John Holland on 2 April 2022.

As of November 2022, it has an allocation of 176 buses.

References

External links
Service NSW

Bus garages
Industrial buildings in Sydney